Trinidad and Tobago competed at the 2022 Winter Olympics in Beijing, China, from 4 to 20 February 2022. It is the country's first appearance in 20 years at the Winter Olympics.

Trinidad and Tobago's final team of two athletes competing in bobsleigh was named on January 19, 2022. On February 3, 2022, bobsledder Andre Marcano was named as the country's flagbearer during the opening ceremony. Meanwhile a volunteer was the flagbearer during the closing ceremony.

Competitors
The following is the list of number of competitors participating at the Games per sport/discipline.

Bobsleigh

Trinidad and Tobago qualified one two-man sled, marking its return to the sport (and Winter Olympics) for the first time since 2002. The team was officially named on January 19, 2022.

* – Denotes the driver of the sled

See also
Tropical nations at the Winter Olympics
Trinidad and Tobago at the 2022 Commonwealth Games

References

Nations at the 2022 Winter Olympics
2022
2022 in Trinidad and Tobago sport